Selecciones Ilustradas (sometimes known as S.I.) is a Spanish art agency founded by Josep Toutain.

Warren Publishing
Selecciones Ilustradas is probably most well known in America due to its connections with Warren Publishing, where S.I.'s artists drew hundreds of stories between 1971 through 1983. The deal with Warren and S.I. began in 1971 when Toutain met with Warren publisher Jim Warren. S.I.'s artists began appearing in Warren magazines starting in Vampirella 11 in May 1971. By 1973 S.I. artists provided the majority of the covers and interior stories in Warren's magazines, a dominance that continued until the late 1970s. S.I. artists also contributed to Warren rival Skywald throughout the early to mid-1970s.

Artists
Artists associated with Selecciones Ilustradas include:

In fiction
The cartoonist Carlos Giménez wrote a fictionalized account on his stint at the studios in his series , where a thinly-veiled depiction of the studio was given the name Creaciones Ilustradas.

References

Talent agencies